Raigastvere is a village in Tartu Parish, Tartu County in eastern Estonia. Lake Raigastvere is located near the village.

References

 

Villages in Tartu County